Shiao Yi (4 June 1935 – 19 November 2018) was a Chinese American wuxia ("martial hero") novelist. and screenwriter who is considered one of the greatest of the genre in the modern era.  Shiao Yi was also the founder and first chairman of the Chinese Writers' Association of North America.

Shiao Yi's Wuxia novels are known for their emphasis on traditional Chinese culture and ethics, the archetype of the Xia (hero), understanding of Taoist philosophy, exquisite sensitivity of romance and human emotions as well as a wide variety of writing styles. Haven written 55 novels and novellas as well as nearly 1,000 essays in the course of his life, Shiao Yi is one of the most successful and prolific Chinese writers to date.  He is considered a new school Wuxia novelist and is also one of the pioneers of the modern xianxia ("immortal heroes") sub-genre.

Twenty of his works have been adapted for film and hundreds of hours of television, influencing the East Asian cultural spheres and the Chinese diaspora.

Shiao Yi is often mentioned alongside Jin Yong in the phrase "Nan Jin Bei Shiao", and as one of the Five Tigers of the Taiwanese Wuxia Scene together with Gu Long, Wolong Sheng, Sima Ling, and Zhuge Qingyun.

Early life
Shiao was born Shiao Ching-Jen in Beijing, on June 4, 1935, to Shiao Chichu, a general of the 26th National Revolutionary Army of the Republic of China (ROC) who was a pivotal figure in successful campaigns against the Japanese. His ancestral home is in Heze, Shandong, also the home to the heroes of classic Chinese novel, The Water Margin.

Shiao had a misfortunate childhood and said in an interview that it was a miracle that he made it to adulthood alive. Born two months premature, he then spent two months in an infant incubator thanks to the modern German medical facilities at the Beijing Friendship Hospital. He spent his childhood in Chongqing during the Second Sino-Japanese War. At age five, he fell off a three-story building when his elder sister challenged him to run on the rooftop with his eyes closed. He then spent six months in the hospital. Shiao moved to Nanjing when he was nine years old. In fourth grade, he spent a summer selling ice-cream with his friend Erhuai and ended up getting typhoid fever and was absent from school for half a year. While he was resting at home, he spent a lot of time reading, especially martial arts novels written by Huanzhulouzhu, Zheng Zhengyin, Zhu Zhenmu and Wang Dulu.

After the defeat of the Nationalists by the Communists in the Chinese Civil War in 1949, his family moved to Taiwan, leaving behind their properties in Nanjing, Hankou and Fuzhou.  Shiao attended Jianguo Middle School in Taipei. He was then accepted to the Republic of China Naval Academy. Two years later, he left school and went home to support his family.

Education 
At a very young age, Shiao was exposed to Peking Opera as well as artists including Ma Lianliang and Shang Xiaoyun. There were also many private performances at home when he was growing up, from which he later drew inspiration for his writing.  One of his father's soldiers, Liang Yanquan (梁燕全), used to be a Shandong clapper ballad performer and told stories such as The Seven Heroes and Five Gallants to Shiao and his friends, and these became Shiao's introduction to Wuxia.

As a military general, Shiao's father was very loyal to the Kuomintang government and did not allow anyone in the family to criticize the government. He also enforced strict rules at home for his children, such as getting up by 6AM, going to bed by 11PM, no smoking or drinking alcohol, and no talking while eating. Thanks to his family education, Shiao was not only very disciplined, but was also instilled with traditional values such as service to one's country, which led him to identify with the ideals of chivalry often found in Wuxia novels. Shiao and his siblings were all very afraid of their father when they were young, but since he often fought on the frontlines and was away from home, Shiao had a lot of freedom to pursue his own interests.

By his fifth and sixth years of elementary school, Shiao has already developed a strong interest in literature and read world classics such as Jean-Christophe and Camille.

After moving to Taiwan in 1949, Shiao went to Jianguo Middle School and became classmates with writer Pai Hsien-yung, who was also the son of a military general, Bai Chongxi. At school, Shiao read almost all of Jin Yong and other Wuxia novelists’ works. In his second year of middle school, Shiao wrote a short story Yellow Cattle, which was published in influential literary magazines in Taiwan, including Ye Feng and Ban Yue Wen Yi.

After high school, Shiao went to the Republic of China Naval Academy for school to fulfill his father's wish that he become a scientist. At the time, his father had already been sick for almost nine years, and spent all of his savings paying hospital and medical bills. During Shiao's sophomore year in college, his father died, and he decided to quit school and go home.

After returning home, Shiao planned to apply to a literature program, but later got into the chemical engineering program at the Chung Yuan Christian College of Science and Engineering. Luckily, Shiao soon started a career in writing wuxia novels, and supported his six younger siblings financially for seven years with the royalties until they finished school and started working.

Career 
When Shiao was attending the Naval Academy, a high school friend Zhong (钟) suggested that he should write a Wuxia novel, since he loved reading them so much. The friend also told him that he could make 300 to 400 new Taiwan dollars per novel. At the time, Wuxia novels were very popular in Hong Kong and Taiwan, and there had been an abundance of Wuxia publications in the market. Shiao took the advice and wrote his first novel, Iron Geese, Wings of Frost when he was 23.

With his friend's introduction, editors of the Xiangji Publishing House (祥記出版社) received the manuscript written in ink and gave it a very positive response. They published the novel in 1960 and it became an instant hit. The Shaw Brothers Studio bought the film rights of the novel and made a two part movie franchise based on it, starring Yu So-chow, Hong Kong's most successful female action star at the time.

The overnight success of Shiao's first book immediately brought him a lot of attention from other publishers, and his second novel The Seven Fists of Ching was also very well received in the market. In 1961, Shiao had already returned to college and had been writing in his spare time, but he decided to quit school again to pursue writing Wuxia novels as a professional writer. For the rest of Shiao's career, he was a professional writer, making him the one and only Wuxia novelist in Hong Kong and Taiwan who never had a second career or worked a single day doing any job other than writing.

Shiao soon became one of the five highest paid writers in Taiwan along with Gu Long, Wolong Sheng, Sima Ling and Zhuge Qingyun, making 2,000 New Taiwan dollars per book (around 20,000 words), while the average Wuxia novelist was making 800 New Taiwan dollars.  They were also called the Five Tigers of the Taiwanese Wuxia Scene.

In the early 70's, Shiao was already a screenwriter for three major Taiwanese TV networks, including the China Television Company.  He also started writing serials for newspapers and at one point Shiao was writing simultaneously for more than 20 newspaper at the same time, including Hong Kong Times, Sin Chew Daily, The Star and Taiwan Daily. It was Shiao's discipline and persistence instead of inspiration that kept him writing non-stop. In a meeting with Stan Lee at the Crustacean Restaurant in Beverly Hills, California, they both agreed that the secret to being prolific was getting up early and writing regardless of inspiration.

After departing Taiwan for America, Shiao's career grew on two unlikely fronts, first, being welcomed into mainland China, the land of his birth, as one of the first wave of non-mainland writers into China and had the opportunity to define the Wuxia genre to post cultural revolution Chinese generation. Beginning in the 1980s, he quickly became one of the top Wuxia novelists in China, reaching a national audience through multiple full library publications, television adaptations, and even serialized radio shows. His works have remained in publication in China since its start in the 1980s.

In 2009, Shiao's manuscripts, photos and letters formally joined the permanent collection of the National Museum of Modern Chinese Literature, exhibited alongside many of China literary greats of all time.

Writing from his home in Los Angeles, California, Shiao unexpectedly became known as the “American Puma” by literary critics, becoming the first and only Chinese American Wuxia writer of acclaim.

Throughout his career, Shiao wrote 55 novels and novellas as well as nearly 1,000 essays, making him one of the most prolific Wuxia writers in the history. His works were first published in mainland China in 1986. His novel, Sister Gan Nineteen (甘十九妹), was adapted into a TV series by Shandong Television in 1996. The series was considered one of the two groundbreaking milestone pieces of Wuxia TV production in mainland China along with Bai Mei Da Xia, earning Shiao nationwide popularity. The TV series still remains a part of the collective memory of the post-70's and post-80's generations. Sister Gan Nineteen was remade for television again in 2015, and after a run on the Movie Channel of Hubei Television, was placed on iQiyi, which as of 2020 has received 300 million views.

Immigration 
In 1977, Shiao and his family emigrated to Los Angeles, California, United States. Prior leaving Taiwan, Shiao's older sister married an Australian diplomat and moved to Australia; while his mother and siblings all immigrated to America. One sister married a Chinese man in Johannesburg, South Africa, and his six other brothers and sisters all emigrated to the United States. Shiao was the only person in his family that was left in Taiwan. Since he could work remotely as a writer, Shiao ended up emigrating to the United States via an EB-1 visa, granted to immigrants of extraordinary ability.

After arriving in Los Angeles, Shiao had a hard time adapting to the new environment during the first three years. The difficulty of maintaining relationships with editors led to him losing most of his writing jobs. It was a time before the internet and email, and newspaper editors did not enjoy dealing with long-distance calls and fax machines. However, thanks to an old colleague at Sin Chew Daily in Hong Kong, Shiao got a job writing news articles about American society. The newspaper created two new columns for Shiao, who used two different pen names, Xueni and Hongzao.

As Shiao was about to change his profession, he got the opportunity to write a column for the United Daily News replacing Gu Long, who had often failed to deliver manuscripts on time. He then got another job writing a serialized Wuxia novel at China Times to replace Jin Yong's serial publication of The Heaven Sword and Dragon Saber. Being the breadwinner of the family, Shiao continued to write novels for these two newspapers for the next seven to eight years, until his three children grew up.

As the only Chinese American Wuxia novelist of his time, Shiao influenced tens of millions of readers with his writing. However, being far away from his homeland, Shiao was not able to promote or market his works in person and relied primarily on his books and readers to do his bidding. Feeling lonely in a foreign country, Shiao would often meet with Chinese friends from the mainland, Hong Kong and Taiwan who loved literature. He later started the North America Chinese Writers’ Association in 1993 and served as the organization's chairman. At the invitation of the Chinese Writers’ Association, Shiao assembled a delegation of 11 writers, and they made their first group visit to mainland China in 1994. Following the initial visit, Shiao made several more visits to mainland China, and continued to foster mutual understanding and exchange between writers from mainland China, Hong Kong, Taiwan and the Chinese diaspora. The North America Chinese Writers’ Association, Los Angeles started a Chinese writing class in 1993, and Shiao served as a teacher. The association also launched its own publication, Los Angeles Writers in 1994.

Personal life 
Shiao married Liu Meiqing in 1964, and they had three sons: William Shiao (also known as Shiao Peiyu), Peter Shiao, and Anthony Shiao (also known as Shiao Peilun). Liu was the classmate of Shiao's younger sister and a fan of Shiao's works. The two met at a bookstore in Taiwan.

As a writer, Shiao would often identify strongly with the characters that he created and go through emotional journeys with them. Once, Shiao felt so emotional that he almost tried to kill himself. Luckily, Liu arrived home from work and Shiao cried in her arms, telling her that she would not have been able to see him again if she had gotten home a bit later. After that day, Liu would call Shiao every few minutes from work to check in on him, just to make sure that he was alive.

Relationship with contemporaries 
As one of the five tigers of the Taiwanese Wuxia scene, Shiao was friends with Gu Long, Wolong Sheng, Sima Ling and Zhuge Qingyun. Shiao and Gu Long were the youngest among the five, but soon surpassed the other three in popularity.

Shiao met Gu Long at a dinner hosted by the publisher that they both worked for. They found out that they went to the same middle school and soon became close friends. Gu Long later served as Shiao's Best Man at his wedding. Both Shiao and Gu Long wrote very quickly. On one occasion, the two of them went to a hot spring in Yilan County to write. Shiao wrote a record-breaking 24,000 words in a single day, which was the amount of text needed then to publish a novel. Shiao and Gu Long also worked on a novel together, Hiss of the Dragon.

Although Shiao and Gu Long were close friends, they had very different personalities and habits. Shiao was a gentleman while Gu Long was a womanizer; Shiao was an early bird while Gu Long was a night owl; Shiao was a teetotaler, while Gu Long was an alcoholic. Shiao even suggested that Gu Long drink in moderation, but Gu Long refused by saying “What’s the meaning of life if I can’t drink? I’d rather die without alcohol.” Prior to his death, Gu Long called Shiao and expressed that he regretted not having listened to his advice earlier.

Overwhelmed by the amount of writing he had to do every day at the time, Shiao did not spend much time reading his fellow writers' works.  This had a positive outcome, because while all the other Wuxia writers were heavily influenced by Gu Long's writing style, Shiao was able to create his own unique style.

Shiao was good friends with novelist and screenwriter Ni Kuang as well. They met when they were both writing screenplays for Shaw Brothers Studio. Later, when Jin Yong and Ni Kuang started the magazine Wuxia and History together, Ni Kuang invited Shiao to write for it.

Shiao was friends with actress Brigitte Lin Ching-hsia, and thought of her as the ideal candidate to play the lead of Sister Gan Nineteen.

Shiao also had a close friendship with writer Liang Shih-chiu, who was both a respected mentor for him and the most loyal reader of Shiao's work. Shiao shared the sense of loneliness that Liang felt as a writer. He thought that writers should both enjoy and avoid loneliness, and that writing was a great source of comfort and catharsis.

Death 
On November 19, 2018, Shiao died of lung cancer at age 83 in a hospital in Los Angeles, only 20 days after the Chinese literary world lost another Wuxia novelist, Jin Yong, and 7 days after Stan Lee, the American comic book writer and publisher whom he had met with in Los Angeles.

Several major Chinese news media published the obituary written by the North America Chinese Writers’ Association, Los Angeles, commemorating the loss of "Nan Jin Bei Shiao,” which referred to Jin Yong and Shiao Yi, the two literary titans of Wuxia who died within weeks of each other.

Posthumous adaptations and honors 
Shiao's entire body of work is being adapted posthumously by his second son, Chinese American entrepreneur and CEO of Immortal Studios, Peter Shiao, as the foundation for an inter-connected modern Wuxia “storyverse” that will first be published as English language comics in partnership with a new generation of writers and artists.

The father-son collaboration was first announced in 2013, and was widely covered by mainstream media in both China and the United States, including Variety, The Hollywood Reporters, People’s Daily, and Sina. Shiao Yi said it was very heartening to be working with his son.

UCLA's Research Library in 2020, has begun efforts to house Shiao's entire literary collection and personal effects, making him the first writer of Asian ancestry to join the UCLA literary collection.

Tie Ning, the Chairwoman of the Chinese Writer's Association, wrote of Shiao, “the death of Mr. Shiao Yi is a huge loss to both Chinese literature and world literature. His achievements and contributions will be remembered in our hearts.”

Works
In his career, Shiao wrote 55 novels and novellas and went through three different creative phases.

The first phase was in the 1960s. Shiao had written 11 novels including Iron Geese, Wings of Frost and The Seven Fists of Ching before he turned 30. These novels were heavily influenced by the works of 1920's Wuxia novelist Wang Dulu such as Crane Startles Kunlun and Precious Sword, Golden Hairpin. The style of writing was very sentimental and melancholy.

The second stage was in the 1970s. Shiao published works such as The Seven Sons of Kunlun, Demons Beyond the Fortress, collectively known as “Chronicles of the Immortal Swordsmen” and Mr. Hibernation prior to turning 40. These works treated the Wuxia world as historical background while exploring new modes of creative expression. However, these works were still heavily influenced by the writers from the 1920s and 1930s, such as Huanzhulouzhu. These works had more fantasy elements that are known to be characteristic of Xianxia novels and focused on the immortal swordsman's self-cultivation, resembling Huanzhulouzhu's Legend of the Swordsmen of the Mountains of Shu.

The third stage was in the late 1970s, when Shiao gradually came up with a writing method of his own, surpassing the previous “sentimental melancholy" and "fantasy immortal swordsman" stages. He followed a new path, focusing on creating atmosphere and human conflicts. When it came to depicting martial arts, he adopted uses of modern optics and other principles in physics. He was critical of the "breakthrough" of the "new school" Wuxia novelists who focused disproportionately on the wu instead of xia in their works; and he was also one of the very few who were unaffected by Gu Long's stylistic influence.

Shiao Yi's major works are:

Philosophy 
The concept of xia was a strong theme in Shiao's works. According to Shiao, a xia was someone who had great power as well as great sympathy for the weak and underprivileged in society. They were swordsmen who had compassion, willpower and were not afraid of powerful governments. They often fought for equality and justice for the ordinary people and even sacrificed themselves for the greater cause. They were martyrs born in the worst times, fighting powerful evils, and therefore were always lonely and lived desolate lives. For Shiao, the concept of xia originated from Mohism in the Spring and Autumn period, got its foothold in Confucianism in the Warring States period,[3] and reached its pinnacle in Taoism.

In his Wuxia novels, Shiao always emphasized the way of xia, which was the spirit of chivalry, much more than the merit of wu, which was power and force. In Shiao's opinion, without compassion, a person with only force or power would end up becoming a hooligan or villain; while a person with compassion and bravery would be respected as a xia even if he or she did not have strong martial arts skills. In an interview, Shiao talked about the differences between the Chinese Wuxia and the Japanese samurai. Japanese samurai were warriors who were loyal to their masters and emperors, but Chinese Wuxia warriors did not have masters. They served the people, fought for justice and were loyal to their own conscience.[4] Shiao thought of the way of xia is a universal value similar to the code of chivalry in Western culture. However, the Chinese Wuxia warriors were usually much more reserved, virtuous  and self-sacrificing compared with European knights and American cowboys and superheroes, also when it came to love and romance.

As a Wuxia novelist, Shiao was himself an embodiment of a xia in real life. As a lover of traditional Chinese culture, Shiao studied astrology and feng shui, and also practiced qigong, a centuries-old practice to cultivate and balance qi, which refers to the energy circulating through the body.[1]  Shiao's works also showed great respect for traditional Chinese culture. To create characters, he drew characteristics from Confucian values such as the five virtues: benevolence (仁), righteousness, etiquette, wisdom and sincerity,[4]  as well as Taoist virtues such as compassion, frugality and humility.

However, unlike Jin Yong, whose works often emphasized and discussed Confucian ideals such as the rigid rituals and social order between ruler and subject, parent and child, and master and apprentice, Shiao's works focused more on the Taoist self-cultivation philosophy and teaching about the various disciplines for achieving "perfection" by becoming one with the rhythms of the universe. In addition, while most of Jin's works are based on historical events and adopt a worldview that the heroes are normal human beings with extraordinary martial arts skills, heroes in many of Shiao's works transcend the limits of being human and become sublime, even immortal.

Criticism 
Shiao Yi was considered as the most influential new school Wuxia novelist in addition to Jin Yong, Liang Yusheng and Gu Long. He was one of the first Wuxia novelists to abandon the Zhang Hui style and tell Wuxia stories in the modern vernacular. Shiao even wrote The River of the Flowing Flowers in an essay style. According to Renmin University of China Professor Leng Chengjin, old school Wuxia novels are those that are stylistically similar to The White Maiden Locked for Eternity in the Leifeng Pagoda, a Wuxia novel written during the Ming dynasty. Whereas the traditional version of the story portrays the female protagonist as a villain, and Jin Yong's version portrays her as a hero, Shiao's retelling of the classic features a modern woman on a nuanced emotional journey.

Shiao was known for his depictions of women and romance in his writing, and many of his works feature female protagonists. Although Jin Yong and Gu Long also created female characters in their novels, they were usually secondary to the male heroes and served as their love interests; whereas Shiao focused more on the xia qualities of his female characters and treated them equally, if not better, than the male characters that he created. According to Shiao, women were more likely to be chivalrous, noting that the first xia recorded in Chinese history was a woman: Yuenü, who could defeat 100 men with her sword skills. Another modern female xia that Shiao admired was Qiu Jin, a revolutionary, feminist and writer executed after a failed uprising against the Qing Dynasty.  Shiao also depicted gay romance in Phoenix of Kunlun.

Shiao wrote in a variety of styles, and the characters that he created ranged from more serious Wuxia swordsmen in classical historical settings to immortal swordsmen, humans who reached the level of deity through Taoist spiritual cultivation. He was one of the pioneers of the modern Qingxia and Xianxia sub-genres of the Wuxia genre.  Peking University Professor Kong Qingdong published an article saying that Shiao Yi was one of a kind in the Wuxia literature circle and should be credited as the Wuxia King of North America.

Adaptations 
Shiao's Wuxia novels have been adapted to numerous films and television series. He also wrote over twenty screenplays that were produced into films, and over two hundred teleplays.[18]

Movies

TV Series

Mainland China

Taiwan

See also 
Jin Yong
Liang Yusheng
Gu Long
Peter Shiao
Xiao Zhichu

References

1935 births
2018 deaths
Screenwriters from Beijing
Writers from Los Angeles
Chung Yuan Christian University alumni
Chinese male novelists
Wuxia writers
20th-century Chinese novelists
Taiwanese male novelists
Chinese emigrants to the United States
Taiwanese people from Beijing
Taiwanese emigrants to the United States
Taiwanese screenwriters
Deaths from lung cancer in California